Nicola Gaffurini (born 15 December 1989) is an Italian former cyclist, who rode professionally between 2014 and 2019 for the  and  teams.

Major results

2011
 7th Trofeo Città di San Vendemiano
 8th Trofeo Internazionale Bastianelli
2012
 3rd Road race, National Amateur Road Championships
2013
 7th Trofeo Internazionale Bastianelli
 8th GP Capodarco
2014
 1st Trofeo Internazionale Bastianelli
 7th Coppa della Pace
 10th Giro del Medio Brenta
2015
 2nd Trofeo Internazionale Bastianelli
 7th Trofeo Matteotti
2016
 3rd Giro del Medio Brenta
 4th Trofeo Matteotti
 6th Tour of Almaty
2017
 1st Belgrade Banjaluka II
 1st Coppa della Pace
 1st Mountains classification Tour of Albania
 2nd GP Adria Mobil
 4th GP Laguna
 4th Trofeo Città di Brescia
 4th Giro del Medio Brenta
 8th Trofeo Matteotti
 8th Coppa Ugo Agostoni
 9th Overall Settimana Internazionale di Coppi e Bartali
 9th Coppa Sabatini
2018
 2nd Overall Tour of Albania
1st Mountains classification
1st Stage 4
 2nd Trofeo Città di Brescia
 10th Overall Sibiu Cycling Tour

References

External links

Italian male cyclists
1989 births
Living people
People from Desenzano del Garda
Cyclists from the Province of Brescia